Noé21 (from the , meaning "New economic orientation for the 21st century") is a non-governmental organisation founded in 2003 and based in Geneva. It promotes solutions to climate change.

Noé21 is a member of the Swiss Climate Alliance, the Alliance for Climate, of the European Council for an Energy Efficient Economy, of the European Environmental Bureau and of the Climate Action Network. The organisation is also accredited to the United Nations Framework Convention on Climate Change.

Activities 

Noé21 promotes energy transition to fight climate change. It evaluates solutions (centre of expertise) and advocates them to decision makers (think tank), through research, seminars, animations in schools and public events.

Together with the Green Party of Switzerland and Greenpeace, Noé21 is currently evaluating having recourse to the judiciary to protect climate.

See also 
 Fossil fuel divestment

References

External links 
 

Organisations based in Geneva
Sustainability organizations
Climate change organizations
Environmental organisations based in Switzerland
Swiss Climate Alliance